Charles Augustus Lafayette Lamar (August 1, 1824 – April 16, 1865) was known as an American businessman from Savannah who invested in the ship Wanderer to import slaves from Africa in 1858, decades after it was prohibited by law. The ship ran blockades and brought 409 surviving slaves from the Congo to the United States for sale. The ship was later impounded. Although Lamar and numerous other defendants were prosecuted, none was convicted of any crime. This was the penultimate slave ship known to have brought in slaves before the Civil War, and the last with a large cargo. The last was Clotilda, which brought 110 slaves to Mobile, Alabama, on July 9, 1860.

Born and raised in Savannah, Georgia, Lamar was the son of businessman and banker Gazaway Bugg Lamar and Jane Meek Cresswell of that city. His mother and all five of his siblings, plus a niece, were lost in the June 1838 explosion and wreck of the steamship Pulaski, when two-thirds of the passengers died. He and his father were among the 59 who survived the sinking.

During the Civil War, Lamar initially organized and commanded the 7th Georgia Battalion. After it was merged with the 61st Georgia Infantry, he returned to civilian life. He worked with his father in the Importing and Exporting Company of Georgia, which supported blockade runners to keep open trade between the Confederacy and the North, as well as having extensive trade relations with England and France. Toward the end of the war, Lamar returned to military service and held the rank of Colonel. He was the last Confederate killed in the Civil War, at the Battle of Columbus.

Early life 
Lamar was born in Savannah in 1824 to Jane Meek (Cresswell) Lamar, also of Savannah, and Gazaway Bugg Lamar. He was named Lafayette after the Revolutionary hero Marquis de Lafayette, who attended his baptism, as stated in the church record. But Lafayette was not designated as Lamar's godfather, as is often mistakenly reported. He was in the US for a valedictory trip.

In June 1838 Lamar and his father were traveling with the rest of their family, then consisting of three daughters and two other sons, and a niece, by the steam packet Pulaski from Savannah to Baltimore, Maryland. They were off the coast of North Carolina when the starboard boiler exploded, destroying the ship and causing it to sink within 45 minutes. Only Charles and his father survived of their family. Some 128 persons were lost; 59 survived.

His father later married again, to Harriet Cazenove of Virginia. He and Charles lived in Alexandria, Virginia, with her for a year before returning to Savannah. His father and stepmother had a total of six children together. In 1846 the senior Lamar decided to move with Harriet and their family to New York City to expand his business dealings, settling in Brooklyn.

Marriage and family
He married Caroline Agnes Nicoll (1825-1902) about 1846 in Savannah, Georgia. She was the daughter of John Nicoll and his wife; Nicoll was appointed as the US District judge in Savannah in 1839. Together Lamar and his wife had many children, but only six survived to adulthood. They were Ann Cazenova, Eliza Anderson, Jane Cresswell, Caroline Nicoll, Georgia Gilliam, and Mary Stites Lamar. Four died within their first year, and one before the age of two.

Career
Charles Lamar was appointed by his father at age 22 to look after his extensive business activities in Savannah and Augusta. He became involved as a businessman in insurance, banking and factoring. He also began to become involved in politics. He became active in the Know Nothing party in the presidential campaign of 1856. Later he became "an ardent member of the Southern Rights party." He advised the young men of Chatham County to join a military corps even before South Carolina seceded.

As part of his interest in Southern rights, Lamar was among Southerners who wanted to reopen the Atlantic slave trade, and organized an investment group to do so. By 1857, he led a group of investors to finance an expedition by Wanderer, a ship built in Setauket, New York, in order to smuggle in slaves from Africa. The ship was outfitted with large water tanks and other requirements of the trans-Atlantic slave trade, illegal since 1808, but passed inspection in New York as a pleasure yacht. It flew the pennant of the New York Yacht Club when it departed the harbor under command of Captain William R. Corrie, who had purchased it.

Lamar's father did not support these activities. He wrote to son John B. Lamar on October 16, 1858, saying, "I am not on Charley's side in the controversy...but he is so impulsive & so crazy on that Negro question-that I can make no impression on him."

It sailed to the Congo-Angola border, long a slave-trading area, where the captain purchased more than 500 slaves. In November 1858 the ship returned across the Atlantic from Africa and unloaded some 409 surviving slaves at southern Jekyll Island outside Savannah. About 300 were taken and held at the plantation of Montmillon, to keep them in hiding. Others were distributed to investors, but they began to be seen in the area.

Because of their filed teeth and tattoos, the new slaves, referred to as "greenies", were recognized as Africans. They were evidence that a ship had recently run the blockade against the Atlantic slave trade. There was considerable outrage in the North when rumors of the slave ship and its large cargo were reported. On December 16, 1858, the U. S. Senate passed a resolution asking President Buchanan to share any information "in relation to the landing of the barque Wanderer on the coast of Georgia with a load of Africans." Wanderer was seized by federal officials, and a total of six trials took place. Lamar was prosecuted as one of the major investors at a trial on May 28, 1860. (Defendants included Northerners.) The federal district judge, John Nicoll, was Lamar's father-in-law. He recused himself in Lamar's case, working on other trials. No link was found between Lamar and the Wanderer. None of the defendants were convicted, as there were several hung juries and mistrials.

Civil War
After the start of the Civil War, Charles Lamar organized and became a lieutenant colonel of the 7th Georgia Battalion. When the 7th merged with the 61st Georgia Volunteer Infantry, Lamar lost his commission. He considered this unjust treatment.

His father had returned to Savannah in 1861, re-establishing himself in the city. From then on until late in the war, Lamar worked with his father in his business interests to keep the South supplied, including through blockade-running ventures. The younger Lamar was sent to England to attempt to buy boats for gun-running. There he worked and traveled with the famous ship captain John Newland Maffitt, a privateer.

Where possible Northern banking contacts were maintained and trade was carried on through the lines or with Europe via blockade runners. Cotton was the weapon; Northern and European credits with which to buy in the North, especially in New York, and in England and France, was the goal.

As the war was winding down, Lamar re-entered the Confederate army as a colonel on the staff of General Howell Cobb. Lamar was accidentally shot and killed after the last battle of the Civil War at Battle of Columbus (1865). It was seven days after General Robert E. Lee had surrendered at Appomattox. General Sherman reported Lamar's death was caused by a stray bullet, and the Savannah Morning News wrote that Lamar was "the last man who fell in organized struggle for Southern independence." He was buried at Linwood Cemetery in Columbus. A year later, his family had his remains moved and re-interred at Laurel Grove.

References

Further reading 

Thomas Lamar Coughlin, Those Southern Lamars (Xlibris: 2010), self-published; does not meet WP requirements as Reliable Source

External links 

 Biographical/Historical Note: G. B. Lamar papers, Library Univ. of Georgia 
 Biographical Note: C. A. Lamar papers, Emory University 
 150th anniversary article, Savannah Morning News
 "The Yacht Wanderer Again", New York Times, 25 October 1859  
 Charles Augustus Lafayette Lamar, Find a Grave

1824 births
1865 deaths
People of Georgia (U.S. state) in the American Civil War
People from Savannah, Georgia
Burials in Georgia (U.S. state)
American slave traders
American slave owners
Georgia (U.S. state) Know Nothings
19th-century American businesspeople
Confederate States Army officers
Confederate States of America military personnel killed in the American Civil War
Firearm accident victims in the United States
Deaths by firearm in Georgia (U.S. state)
Accidental deaths in Georgia (U.S. state)